Human Animal is the fifth studio album by American noise music group Wolf Eyes, released on September 26, 2006, by Sub Pop. The title track "Human Animal" is different from the one originally issued on the Wolf Eyes/Prurient split The Warriors (2005). "Noise Not Music" was originally by hardcore punk band No Fucker. The album received critical praise upon release.

Track listing
 "A Million Years"  – 5:01
 "Lake of Roaches"  – 1:58
 "Rationed Rot"  – 8:09
 "Human Animal"  – 3:32
 "Rusted Mange"  – 2:12
 "Leper War"  – 6:03
 "The Driller"  – 3:58
 "Noise Not Music"  – 2:19 (CD only)

References

2006 albums
Wolf Eyes albums
Sub Pop albums